HLH may refer to:

Biology and medicine 

 Hemophagocytic lymphohistiocytosis, a blood disorder
 Basic helix–loop–helix, a structural motif in proteins
 Hectopsyllidae, a family of parasitic fleas

Places 

 Haydom Lutheran Hospital, in Manyara Region, Tanzania
 Ulanhot Yilelite Airport, in Inner Mongolia, China
 Hulan District, in Harbin, China; see List of administrative divisions of Heilongjiang
 Merrill (Marriner Wood) Hall, a dorm at Brigham Young University in Provo, Utah, U.S.; see List of Brigham Young University buildings#Helaman Halls

Other uses 
 HLH Orion minicomputer, by High Level Hardware Ltd
 Harry Lloyd Hopkins (1890–1946), an American statesman; see George Racey Jordan#Congressional testimony
 Hillesheimite, a mineral; see List of mineral symbols#H
 Hala Air, an airline based in Sudan; see List of airline codes (H)
 Heavy-lift helicopter, a type of military helicopter
 Haklau Min, a variety of Min Chinese, by proposed ISO 639-3 code